The 1963 Wyoming Cowboys football team was an American football team that represented the University of Wyoming as a member of the Western Athletic Conference (WAC) during the 1963 NCAA University Division football season.  In their second season under head coach Lloyd Eaton, the Cowboys compiled a 6–4 record (2–3 against conference opponents), finished fifth in the WAC, and outscored opponents by a total of 191 to 152. Mack Balls and Tom Delaney were the team captains.

Schedule

References

Wyoming
Wyoming Cowboys football seasons
Wyoming Cowboys football